Russian Tennis Federation is a national governing body of tennis in Russia, founded as the All-Russia Tennis Association in 1989 and reorganized under the current name in 2002. It is the successor of Tennis Federation of the RSFSR (1959–1989) and the Tennis Federation of the USSR (1959–93, known before as All-Union Tennis Section, 1929-1959).

In reaction to the 2022 Russian invasion of Ukraine, the ITF suspended the Russian Tennis Federation. In addition, Tennis Europe suspended the federation from membership. Teams representing Russia were therefore ineligible to compete at all Tennis Europe events (including Winter & Summer Cups, European Beach Tennis, and Senior Club Championships). All Tennis Europe events in Russia were suspended, including the European Junior Tennis Championships (16 & Under) in Moscow, and delegates from Russia were not eligible to attend the 2022 Annual General Meeting of Tennis Europe. Russia's participation in the Davis Cup and Billie Jean King Cup was suspended and, while most other tour-level events still accepted entries from Russian players, players were not able to compete under the name or flag of Russia. Tennis tournaments based in Russia were also cancelled.

In April 2022, players that represented both Russia and Belarus were banned from the 2022 Wimbledon Championships, as well as other events in the United Kingdom. This ban was facilitated by the AELTC and the LTA. Players born in Russia or Belarus, including Moscow-born women's singles champion Elena Rybakina, were able to compete, however. This decision was criticised by the ATP, WTA, and ITF, and, in May 2022, a decision was made to strip Wimbledon of its ranking points, with the tours describing the decision as undermining "the ability for players of any nationality to enter tournaments based on merit, and without discrimination."

Tennis in Russia

Despite his Scottish surname and ancestry, Arthur Davidovich McPherson (1870–1919) was a native of Petersburg and lived his entire life in Russia. He was the founder and president of the first All-Russian Union of Lawn Tennis Clubs, the forerunner of today's Russian Tennis Federation, and also helped establish the country's first Olympic Committee.

In 1903 he organized the first St. Petersburg tennis championship, and four years later he set up the first national tournament. By 1913 the Russian championship was on the international tour and the game was thriving.

During the Soviet era, tennis was on the edge of survival as both non-Olympic and expensive sport strongly associated with the local royal dynasty (Holstein-Gottorp-Romanov). From 1974, for a whole decade Soviet tennis players had been forced by the Tennis Federation of the USSR to boycott all the international competitions, except for the Davis Cup, in an unsuccessful attempt of the regime to influence apartheid in South Africa. In addition, local men's tennis players were seriously bullied by the other Soviet sportspeople for competing in a 'girlie' sport. At a certain point, about 80 percent of tennis coaches in the USSR were women.

Since the end of the Soviet era tennis has grown in popularity and Russia has produced a number of famous tennis players. In recent years, the number of top Russian women players has been considerable, with both Maria Sharapova and Dinara Safina reaching number one in the WTA rankings. Other Russian women to achieve international success include Anna Chakvetadze, Elena Dementieva, Svetlana Kuznetsova, Anastasia Myskina, Nadia Petrova, Vera Zvonareva and Anna Kournikova. The Russian Federation has won the Fed Cup 4 times, in 2004, 2005, 2007 and 2008.

At the 2008 Beijing Olympics, Russia swept the women's tennis podium with Elena Dementieva winning the gold, Dinara Safina and Vera Zvonareva the silver and bronze, respectively. As of 5 October 2009, four Russian women were ranked in the WTA tour's top 10.

Russia also boasts three former number 1 men's players—Safina's older brother Marat Safin, Yevgeny Kafelnikov and Daniil Medvedev. Russian men currently in the top 10 include Daniil Medvedev and Andrey Rublev, the former of which was a finalist at the 2019 US Open, 2021 Australian Open, 2022 Australian Open. He won the 2021 US Open. Medvedev had briefly reached the number 1 ranking in February 2022, before being overtaken by Novak Djokovic. He reached the number 1 ranking again in June 2022. Medvedev was the first player that reached number 1 without being a member of the 'Big Four'; Novak Djokovic, Roger Federer, Andy Murray, and Rafael Nadal, since February 2004.

Performance table

Juniors

16-and-under teams

Junior GS singles finalists by year
Local Boys' titles

Local Boys' runner-ups

Local Girls' titles

Local Girls' runner-ups

Junior GS singles titles by country

Junior GS doubles champions by year

Junior GS doubles titles by country

Olympics medal count

References

Tennis
Sports organizations established in 2002
Tennis in Russia
2002 establishments in Russia